Omar Sami Hamadeh Qarada (born 1 March 1981) is a Jordanian Paralympic powerlifter. He is a three-time medalist at the Summer Paralympics, including gold in 2021, and a four-time medalist, including two gold medals, at the World Para Powerlifting Championships. He is the first powerlifter representing Jordan to win a gold medal at the Paralympics.

Career 

He represented Jordan at the 2008, 2016, and the 2020 Summer Paralympics. He won a medal on all three of those occasions: in 2008, he won the silver medal in the men's 48 kg and at the 2016 Summer Paralympics in the men's 49 kg event, as well as gold in the men's 49 kg at the 2020 Summer Paralympics. Both Qarada and Lê Văn Công of Vietnam lifted 173 kg at the 2020 Summer Paralympics and Qarada won the gold medal as a result of his lighter body weight.

He is also a two-time gold medalist in his event at the World Para Powerlifting Championships; he won the gold medal both in 2010 and in 2021. In 2017, he won the silver medal in the men's 49 kg event at the World Para Powerlifting Championships held in Mexico City, Mexico. At the 2019 World Para Powerlifting Championships held in Nur-Sultan, Kazakhstan, he also won the silver medal in the men's 49 kg event.

At the 2010 Asian Para Games held in Guangzhou, China, he won the gold medal in his event.

Results

References

External links 
 

Living people
1981 births
Place of birth missing (living people)
Powerlifters at the 2008 Summer Paralympics
Powerlifters at the 2016 Summer Paralympics
Powerlifters at the 2020 Summer Paralympics
Medalists at the 2008 Summer Paralympics
Medalists at the 2016 Summer Paralympics
Medalists at the 2020 Summer Paralympics
Paralympic medalists in powerlifting
Paralympic gold medalists for Jordan
Paralympic silver medalists for Jordan
Jordanian male weightlifters
Paralympic powerlifters of Jordan
21st-century Jordanian people
Medalists at the 2010 Asian Para Games